This is a list of the confirmed tornadoes during the tornado outbreak of May 26–31, 2013.

Confirmed tornadoes

May 26 event

May 27 event

May 28 event

May 29 event

May 30 event

May 31 event

See also
Tornadoes of 2013
Tornado outbreak of May 26–31, 2013
List of United States tornadoes in May 2013

Notes

References

Tornadoes in the United States
Tornadoes of 2013
May 2013 events in the United States
2013 natural disasters in the United States